Archimylacris (meaning "primitive Mylacris", in reference to another species of Carboniferous cockroach) is an extinct genus of cockroach-like blattopterans, a group of insects ancestral to cockroaches, mantids, and termites.

Archimylacris lived on the warm, swampy forest floors of North America and Europe 300 million years ago, in the Late Carboniferous times. Like modern cockroaches, this insect had a large head shield with long, curved antennae, or feelers, and folded wings. To a modern observer, it would likely appear as a moderate-sized cockroach, with a "tail" (ovipositor) in the female. Presumably, its habits would be cockroach-like, too, scurrying along the undergrowth eating anything edible, possibly falling prey to labyrinthodont amphibians and very early reptiles.
The average length of Archimylacris species was 2–3 cm.

References

Pennsylvanian insects
Prehistoric insect genera
Paleozoic insects of North America
Transitional fossils
Prehistoric insects of North America
Prehistoric insects of Europe
Fossil taxa described in 1868
Paleozoic life of Nova Scotia

Fossils of Wales